German submarine U-202 was a Type VIIC U-boat of the Kriegsmarine during World War II. The submarine was laid down on 18 March 1940 by the Friedrich Krupp Germaniawerft yard at Kiel as yard number 631, launched on 10 February 1941, and commissioned on 22 March under the command of Kapitänleutnant Hans-Heinz Linder.

She sank nine ships totalling  and damaged four more totalling .

She was sunk on 2 June 1943 in the North Atlantic by depth charges and gunfire from British warships after a lengthy series of depth charge attacks. 18 men died, there were 30 survivors.

Design
German Type VIIC submarines were preceded by the shorter Type VIIB submarines. U-202 had a displacement of  when at the surface and  while submerged. She had two shafts and two  propellers.

U-202 was fitted with five  torpedo tubes (four fitted at the bow and one at the stern), fourteen torpedoes, one  SK C/35 naval gun, 220 rounds, and a  C/30 anti-aircraft gun. The boat had a complement of between forty-four and sixty.

Service history
Part of the 1st U-boat Flotilla, U-202 conducted nine patrols in the North Atlantic, the last three under the command of Kptlt. Günter Poser; she was a member of ten wolfpacks.

First, second and third patrols
U-202s first patrol began when she left Kiel on 17 June 1941; it passed without incident and concluded with her entry into Brest in France on 23 July after 37 days at sea.

She had more success on her second outing; departing Brest on 11 August, attacking and sinking two ships east of Greenland and south of Iceland before returning to Brest on 17 September 1941.

Her third patrol, beginning on 16 October, which was also successful, saw the destruction of the British-registered  and Gretavale northeast of Newfoundland. She returned to her French base on 13 November, after a voyage of 29 days.

Fourth, fifth and sixth patrols
The submarine's fourth sortie was towards the Moroccan coast. U-202 left Brest on 13 December 1941. She returned empty-handed on 27 December.

This patrol was from 1 March to 26 April, a total of 57 days.

Her sixth foray, commencing on 27 May, was also successful. On 12 June she landed four saboteurs at Amagansett, New York, on Long Island, as part of Operation Pastorius. The U-boat reached Brest on 25 July, after 60 days.

Seventh, eighth and ninth patrols
The boat's seventh patrol took in the northern coast of South America, leaving Brest on 6 September 1942. Things did not go well; U-202 was attacked by British aircraft on 8 September while still in the Bay of Biscay and again on 29 September southeast of Trinidad. Although damaged, the U-boat continued her patrol, sinking two ships before returning to base on 25 October.

She sank one ship and damaged three others after commencing her eighth patrol on 12 January 1943. She was attacked south of the Azores on 23 February. The U-boat returned to Brest on 26 March after 74 days away.

Her ninth and final sortie began on 29 April 1943 and came to an end when she was sunk on 2 June 1943.

Wolfpacks
U-202 took part in ten wolfpacks, namely:
 Grönland (17 – 27 August 1941)
 Markgraf (27 August – 11 September 1941)
 Schlagetot (20 October – 1 November 1941)
 Raubritter (1 – 5 November 1941)
 Delphin (20 January – 9 February 1943)
 Rochen (9 – 28 February 1943)
 Tümmler (1 – 19 March 1943)
 Without name (5 – 10 May 1943)
 Lech (10 – 15 May 1943)
 Donau 2 (15 – 26 May 1943)

Sinking
U-202 was detected by 'HF/DF' (radio detection equipment) of ships in the Second Support Group (headed by the British sloop  commanded by Captain FJ Walker RN), when she transmitted a daily report at 9:30 am on the 1 June 1943. On closing the range, Starlings lookout spotted the swirl of water where U-202 had just crash dived after identifying the approaching vessels as warships. Five minutes later, the U-boat was detected with ASDIC (sonar) and attacked with depth charges. Despite much evasive action and the use of submarine bubble targets to confuse the British sonar, the submarine could not shake off her pursuers. The six British warships eventually adopted the strategy of keeping the submarine moving, so as to use up her reserves of battery power. The expectation was that the submarine would surface after dark and attempt to escape at speed on the surface. U-202 surfaced just after midnight and was immediately engaged by the guns of the escort group. Starling closed to ram, but Walker decided at the last moment that the submarine was already beaten and turned aside, firing depth charges at a shallow setting from the port thrower as she passed by. The damaged submarine took 40 minutes to sink.

It was a textbook attack that pleased Walker enough to signal 'splice the mainbrace' (issue rum) in celebration.

Summary of raiding history

Portrayal in media
At least three books have been written about the 1942 raid, the 1959 book Eight Spies against America by John Dasch, the 1961 book They Came to Kill by Eugene Rachlis, and the 2004 book "Saboteurs:The Nazi Raid on America," by Michael Dobbs.

Notes

References

Bibliography

External links

World War II submarines of Germany
German Type VIIC submarines
U-boats commissioned in 1941
U-boats sunk in 1943
U-boats sunk by British warships
U-boats sunk by depth charges
1941 ships
Ships built in Bremen (state)
Maritime incidents in June 1943